Tame is an analytic research tool for Twitter that was developed in 2012 by Arno Dirlam (CTO), Frederik Fischer (CEO) and Torsten Müller (CCO).

Tame is a spin-off from Humboldt University of Berlin. The team of journalists and developers who developed Tame were aiming to design a search engine able to collect data in real-time for Twitter by ranking the frequency of hashtags being used, users being mentioned and the most shared links.
Tame is mainly used by journalists (e.g. ZDF, ARD, Die Zeit), politicians, PR, NGOs, and marketing experts.

Tame was funded through crowdfunding through Companisto. It was able to collect €250.000 (ca. US$335.000) in venture capital.  Additionally, Tame gained further financing from “Pro FIT” program by Investitionsbank Berlin in a six-figure amount in 2013. It was presented as a start-up at ARTE Future, and the German social media conference re:publica.

External links

References

Twitter services and applications
Companies based in Berlin